The Meulenwald, also called the Mühlenwald, is a bunter sandstone hill ridge, up to , in the southern part of the Eifel mountains in the counties of Trier-Saarburg and Bernkastel-Wittlich in the German state of Rhineland-Palatinate.

Geography

Location 
The Meulenwald is part of the Moselle Eifel and extends from Ehrang/Quint in the northern part of the borough of Trier in the southwest to the Wittlich Basin near Salmtal in the northeast and between Zemmer to the west and Hetzerath to the east. In the southwest it reaches the Kyll and in the northeast as far as the Salm, both tributaries of the Moselle; the streams of Quintbach and the Bendersbach flow within the hill range.

Natural regions 
The Meulenwald forms a natural region subunit (Meulenwald, 270.7) within the major unit group of the East Eifel (No. 27) and major unit of the Moselle Eifel (270).

Hills 
The hills and high points of the Meulenwald include the following – sorted by height in metres (m) above sea level (NHN):
 Kellerberg (448.8 m), immediately south of Dierscheid
 Steinenberg (423.1 m), immediately east of Naurath
 Zoonenberg (401.9 m), north of Ehrang
 Römerberg (359.0 m), southeast of Kordel
 Rothenberg (269.7 m), between Quint and Issel

Settlements 
Settlements in and on the edge of the Meulenwald are:
 City of Trier: Ehrang/Quint
 Trier-Saarburg (county and southern part of the Meulenwald)
 Trier-Land: collective municipality including Zemmer, Kordel
 Schweich an der Römischen Weinstraße: collective municipality including Föhren, Naurath
 Bernkastel-Wittlich (county and northern part of the Meulenwald; hedge country)
 Wittlich-Land: collective municipality including Bruch, Dierscheid, Dodenburg, Dreis, Gladbach, Heckenmünster, Heidweiler, Hetzerath, Erlenbach, Niersbach, Greverath, Dörbach, Sehlem.

References 

Regions of the Eifel
Protected landscapes in Germany
Landscapes of Rhineland-Palatinate
Forests and woodlands of Rhineland-Palatinate